The Daxi culture (5000–3300 BC) was a Neolithic culture centered in the Three Gorges region around the middle Yangtze, China. The culture ranged from western Hubei to eastern Sichuan and the Pearl River Delta. The site at Daxi, located in the Qutang Gorge around Wushan, Chongqing, was discovered by Nels C. Nelson in the 1920s.

Material culture
Daxi sites are typified by the presence of dou (cylindrical bottles), white pan (plates), and red pottery. The Daxi people cultivated rice extensively. Daxi sites were some of the earliest in China to show evidence of moats and walled settlements.

The Daxi culture showed evidence of cultural interactions with the Yangtze River Delta region. The white pan artefacts from the culture were discovered at several Yangtze River Delta sites, including the type site of the Majiabang culture. Conversely, jade artefacts at Daxi sites show possible influence from the Yangtze River Delta region. The Daxi culture was followed by the Qujialing culture.

People of Daxi
Remains at Daxi were found to possess a high frequency of the Y-chromosome haplogroup O3d-M7 (also referred to as O-M7), which was not found at other prehistoric sites in China. Huang et al. (2022) found that the most common Y-chromosome haplogroup among many Hmongic-speaking ethnic groups (including Guangxi Miao, Hunan Miao, Hunan Pa-Hng, and Thailand Hmong) is O2a2a2a1a2a1a2-N5 (a subclade of O-M7), with a frequency of 47.1% among the Guangxi Miao. This might indicate that the people of Daxi were the ancestors of Hmong–Mien speakers, who subsequently migrated to the southwest.

See also
 List of Neolithic cultures of China
 Chengtoushan
 Pengtoushan culture
 Shijiahe culture

References

 Allan, Sarah (ed), The Formation of Chinese Civilization: An Archaeological Perspective, 
 Chang, Kwang-chih. The Archaeology of Ancient China, 

Neolithic cultures of China
5th-millennium BC establishments